Battle of Chinchow was a battle between the People's Liberation Army and the National Revolutionary Army during the Liaoshen Campaign in the Chinese Civil War. The battle was a turning point in the campaign, which eventually led to capture of Northeast China by the Communist Party.

Background

Chinchow is a key strategic point where the main route from central China through Shanhai Pass enters Manchuria. The fall of Jinzhou to the Communists would allow the Communist to drive into the North China Plain. Mao Zedong addressed the importance of capturing Jinzhou in a telegram to the Communist commanders in the Northeast, saying that the key to the success of the entire Liaoshen Campaign is "to strive to capture Jinzhou in one week."

Outside the city
To attack Chinchow, it was necessary for the PLA to clear away the Nationalist positions in the outskirts of Jinzhou. Between 8 to 13 October, the Communists captured all the Nationalist strongholds outside Jinzhou, which set up the final assault on 14 October.  In the meantime, in the Battle of Tashan nine PLA divisions defeated eleven NRA divisions attempting to reinforce Jinzhou.

Final assault
The PLA massed 900 artillery pieces, and launched the final assault on Chinchow on 14 October 1948. The entire defensive line of Jinzhou was broken through soon after. Nationalist resistance ended the next day on 15 October.

References

Citations

Bibliography 

 

Jinzhou
J
Military history of Manchuria
1948 in China